Kristen Foster (born January 27, 1987 in Morden, Manitoba) is a Canadian curler. 

In 2003, Foster led her Morden Collegiate Institute team to a Manitoba High School championship.

Foster had played with the Chelsea Carey rink since it formed in 2007. Since joining the rink, the team has won one Grand Slam event, the 2010 Manitoba Lotteries Women's Curling Classic and one provincial championship, the 2014 Manitoba Scotties Tournament of Hearts. The team has also played in three Canada Cups, in 2010, 2011 and 2012- finishing 2nd in 2011. The team also played in the 2013 Canadian Olympic Curling Trials, where they placed 4th. They won the bronze medal at the 2014 Scotties Tournament of Hearts. After the season, she joined the Allison Flaxey rink.

Personal life
Foster is currently a staff accountant with Bridge Road Developments and is a CGA Student. She is married to Wilt Billing.

References

External links

Living people
1987 births
Canadian women curlers
Curlers from Manitoba
People from Morden, Manitoba
Canada Cup (curling) participants